The Cornell Big Red women's ice hockey program will represent Cornell University during the 2012–13 NCAA Division I women's ice hockey season.  The Big Red will attempt to win their first NCAA tournament.

Offseason
July 18, 2012: Six players from the Big Red roster were invited to Hockey Canada's Under-22 Evaluation Camp. Among the players invited were Laura Fortino, Brianne Jenner, Hayleigh Cudmore, Jessica Campbell, Jillian Saulnier and Emily Fulton.

Recruiting

Regular season

Standings

Schedule

Awards and honors

Team awards

References

Cornell
Cornell Big Red women's ice hockey seasons
Cornell
Cornell